Sklené is a village and municipality in Turčianske Teplice District in the Žilina Region of northern central Slovakia.

History
In historical records the village was first mentioned in 1360. Until the end of World War II his village was called Glaserhau and populated mostly by German Catholic farmers who had originally migrated here in the 1400 as gold miners. During the Slovak National Uprising Slovak partisans committed a massacre on 21 September 1944 among the German population of the village, killing 186 inhabitants. Since 1994 a memorial commemorates the victims.

Geography
The municipality lies at an altitude of 588 metres and covers an area of 40.502 km². It has a population of about 788 people.

External links

http://www.statistics.sk/mosmis/eng/run.html

Other projects 

Villages and municipalities in Turčianske Teplice District